The running man is a street dance, consisting of "shuffling" and sliding steps, imitating a stationary runner. The dancer takes steps forward, then slides the foot placed in front backwards almost immediately, while moving their fists forwards and back horizontally in front of them. The fad dance was said to have been started in the mid-1980s. 

Notable performers of the dance were MC Hammer, Janet Jackson, Five Star, Selena, Milli Vanilli and Vanilla Ice during their live concert shows and in music videos.

Dance history 
The running man is one of the most recognizable hip hop dances. According to Essence magazine, Paula Abdul created the dance and taught it to Janet Jackson when she was working as her choreographer during Jackson's album Control (1986). Abdul also choreographed the 1987 film The Running Man. Jackson further popularized the dance, when she performed it in her 1989 music video "Rhythm Nation". 

Others sources claim MC Hammer developed the party dance. Before the 1980s ended, Hammer made the dance his own, complete with his signature Hammer pants. Bobby Brown also popularized the Roger Rabbit dance (similar to a "backwards" running man), as seen in the music video for his song "Every Little Step" (1989).

The running man achieved a meme revival during the 2000s, being performed in a similar manner as the Melbourne shuffle dance style. Additionally, singer Britney Spears performed it during her The M+M's Tour, and Scarlett Johansson claimed "I do a great running man" in an interview with Seventeen.

In 2008, "Something Good" by the Utah Saints was re-released. The video, set in 1989, comically suggests that the running man craze started in Cardiff, Wales. It features many people dancing the running man and ends with the "rights" to the dance being signed over to MC Hammer under duress.

The pop duo LMFAO brought the running man back into the mainstream with their song "Party Rock Anthem", which was named the 2011 song of the summer by Billboard.

See also 
 Hip hop dance
 Melbourne shuffle
 Novelty and fad dances
 Running Man Challenge
 Street dance

References 

Novelty and fad dances
Articles containing video clips
Fela Kuti